Roaring Spring is a historic home located near Gloucester, Gloucester County, Virginia.  It was built about 1725, and is a 1-story, four bay, gambrel roofed frame dwelling.   The interior features Greek Revival style details.

It was added to the National Register of Historic Places in 1972.

References

External links
Roaring Springs, State Route 616 vicinity, Gloucester, Gloucester County, VA: 22 photos, 1 color transparencies, 9 measured drawings, and 3 photo caption pages at Historic American Buildings Survey

Historic American Buildings Survey in Virginia
Houses on the National Register of Historic Places in Virginia
Greek Revival houses in Virginia
Houses completed in 1725
Houses in Gloucester County, Virginia
National Register of Historic Places in Gloucester County, Virginia
1725 establishments in Virginia